The RS-27A is a liquid-fuel rocket engine developed in 1980s by Rocketdyne for use on the first stage of the Delta II and Delta III launch vehicles. It provides  of thrust burning RP-1 and LOX in a gas-generator cycle. The engine is a modified version of its predecessor, the RS-27; its thrust nozzle has been extended to increase its area ratio from 8:1 to 12:1, which provides greater efficiency at altitude.

The RS-27A main engine is neither restartable nor throttleable. In addition to its main engine, it includes two vernier engines to provide vehicle roll control during flight.. When used as the main booster propulsion system for the Delta II family of launch vehicles, has an operational duration of 265 seconds.
The last RS-27A engine was used for the ICESat-2 launch on 15 September, 2018.

References

External links
 Aerojet Rocketdyne RS-27A Product Page 
 Pratt and Whitney RS-27A Brochure

Rocketdyne engines
Rocket engines using the gas-generator cycle
Rocket engines using kerosene propellant
Rocket engines of the United States